
Gmina Ostróda is a rural gmina (administrative district) in Ostróda County, Warmian-Masurian Voivodeship, in northern Poland. Its seat is the town of Ostróda, although the town is not part of the territory of the gmina.

The gmina contains part of the protected area called Dylewo Hills Landscape Park.

Villages
Gmina Ostróda contains the villages and settlements of: 
 
 Bałcyny
 Bednarki
 Brzydowo
 Buńki
 Cibory
 Ciemniak
 Czarny Róg
 Czerwona Karczma
 Czyżówka
 Durąg
 Dziadyk
 Gąski
 Gierłoż
 Giętlewo
 Glaznoty
 Górka
 Grabin
 Grabinek
 Gruda
 Idzbark
 Jabłonka
 Jankowiec
 Janowo
 Kajkowo
 Kątno
 Klonowo
 Kraplewo
 Lesiak Lipowski
 Lesiak Ostródzki
 Lichtajny
 Lipowiec
 Lipowo
 Lubajny
 Marciniaki
 Marynowo
 Międzylesie
 Miejska Wola
 Młyn Idzbarski
 Morliny
 Naprom
 Nastajki
 Nowa Gierłoż
 Nowe Siedlisko
 Nowy Folwark
 Ornowo
 Ostrowin
 Pancerzyn
 Pietrzwałd
 Pobórze
 Podlesie
 Prusowo
 Przylądek
 Reszki
 Rudno
 Ruś Mała
 Ryn
 Ryńskie
 Samborówko
 Samborowo
 Smykówko
 Smykowo
 Stare Jabłonki
 Staszkowo
 Szafranki
 Szklarnia
 Szyldak
 Turznica
 Tyrowo
 Wałdowo
 Warlity Wielkie
 Wirwajdy
 Wólka Klonowska
 Wólka Lichtajńska
 Worniny
 Wygoda
 Wysoka Wieś
 Wyżnice
 Zabłocie
 Zajączki
 Zawady Małe
 Żurejny
 Zwierzewo

Neighbouring gminas
Gmina Ostróda is bordered by the town of Ostróda and by the gminas of Dąbrówno, Gietrzwałd, Grunwald, Iława, Lubawa, Łukta, Miłomłyn and Olsztynek.

References
 Polish official population figures 2006

Ostroda
Ostróda County